Sleepless Night is a Belgian short film directed by Samuel Tilman. The film won the 2011 Magritte Award for Best Short Film.

The film follows a rescue team which tries to save a young woman and her mountaineering companions stuck in the mountain in a winter's night.

References

External links

Belgian short films
2010 films
2010s French-language films
Magritte Award winners
2010 short films
French-language Belgian films